Gardy-Kate Ruder (born 1954 in Lahr in the Black Forest of Germany) is a German author and teacher who is now based in Baden-Württemberg. She writes about the victims of the Nazis.

She originally worked as a teacher in primary and secondary schools.

She integrated the story of her grandmother Katharina, who was killed in the extermination camp in Grafeneck, into her own biography.

This book, Katharina Ketterer - victim of "euthanasia", has changed her life.

Since 1999 she has written for local newspapers. In 2003, she realized in Lahr the project "Stolpersteine" of the artist Gunter Demnig, who lives in Koeln, in her own birth town and in the one of her grandmother Katharina. Writing gave her the possibility to clear up structures of ignoring German History, finding a form to accept what really happened.

References
Gardy-Käthe Ruder, Holocaust im Gedächtnis einer Puppe. Unterwegs auf Lebensspuren von und mit Inge Auerbacher. Deutscher Wissenschafts-Verlag, Baden-Baden 2006. 
Gabriel Richter (Hg.), Die Fahrt ins Graue(n), die Heil- und Pflegeanstalt Emmendingen 1933 - 1945 - und danach, zweite durchgesehene und erweiterte Auflage 2005: Gardy Ruder, Katharina Ketterer - ein Opfer der "Euthanasie" geboren am 21. November 1898 in Lahr, ermordet am 26. November 1940 in Grafeneck, S. 323.
Der Ortenaukreis (Hg.) Geroldsecker Land, Jahrbuch einer Landschaft, Heft 46, 2004, Gardy Ruder, Ein "Stolperstein" für Lili Reckendorf, S. 63
Amazon.de

Historians of the Holocaust
1954 births
Living people
German women writers
German schoolteachers